Šrámek (feminine Šrámková) is a Czech and Slovak surname, it may refer to:

 Bohunka Šrámková (born 1946), also known as Muki Bolton, Czech pair skater
 Fráňa Šrámek, Czech poet
 Jan Šrámek, Czech politician
 Jan Šrámek (figure skater), Czech figure skater
 Jana Šramková (born 1976), Czech rhythmic gymnast
 Jaroslav Šrámek, Czechoslovak fighter pilot
 Rebecca Šramková (born 1996), Slovak tennis player

Czech-language surnames
Slovak-language surnames